Keith Aitken is an Australian former rugby league footballer who played for South Sydney and Eastern Suburbs.

References

Rugby league players from Sydney
Living people
South Sydney Rabbitohs players
Sydney Roosters players
Rugby league second-rows
Rugby league locks
1942 births